Private railways in Norway consist of industrial and public railways. Industrial railways were used to transport ore or other industrial products to ports, although they have, particularly to begin with, also operated passenger and cargo services. The other nine private railways have been public and operated as mixed passenger and freight services. Of these, four were later taken over by the Norwegian State Railways (NSB). Only five non-industrial railways were never nationalized, despite all having been closed. There were the Nesttun–Os, Holmestrand–Vittingfoss, Lillesand–Flaksvand, Tønsberg–Eidsfoss and the Lier lines. No industrial railways remain in operation, although one former private railway, the Trunk Line, Norway's first railway, is still in use.

The division between private and publicly owned railways is related to operation rather than ownership. All non-industrial private railways received state grants for construction, while many of NSB's railways were at first organized as limited companies with private owners, although NSB was responsible for all operations and maintenance of the line and rolling stock. For both NSB-run and private, non-industrial railways, municipalities and counties were often the largest owners. Eventually, all the private, non-industrial railways started losing money, and unless they received subsidies, were forced to close. However, the state and municipalities often provided subsidies to keep them operational. The last private railway to close was the Lillesand–Flaksvand Line, in 1958.

List
The following is a list of the private railways in Norway. It includes the line, type (industrial or public), the owner at the time the railway was closed, the longest length of the line, the gauge, the date the line opened, was nationalized and was closed for passenger and cargo, if applicable. The list only contains industrial railways which at some point had regular passenger transport.

References

Bibliography

Rail transport in Norway
 
Narrow gauge railways in Norway